Volterra Semiconductor, commonly known as "Volterra," was acquired by Maxim Integrated in October 2013. Volterra was a fabless semiconductor company that designed and manufactured mixed-signal integrated circuits used in power management applications.  The company was founded in 1996 and was headquartered in Fremont, California, United States.

Volterra became a public company via an initial public offering of its stock at $8.00 per share on July 29, 2004.

Product line
Volterra's product line consisted primarily of integrated circuits and chipsets that manage power for low voltage, extremely high current applications, such as desktop and notebook PC and workstation motherboards, network servers, and video controllers.

The company directly employed about 200-500 people and reported net revenue of $39.9 million for the first quarter of 2013.

Volterra is named for Vito Volterra, an Italian mathematician and physicist, who is best known as the father of the Volterra series.

References

Defunct semiconductor companies of the United States
Companies based in Fremont, California
Fabless semiconductor companies
Electronics companies established in 1996
Technology companies based in the San Francisco Bay Area
Companies formerly listed on the Nasdaq
2004 initial public offerings
2013 mergers and acquisitions